Bizeux Rock is a rocky island  long lying  east of Manchot Island and close northeast of Cape Margerie, Antarctica. It was charted in 1950 by the French Antarctic Expedition and named by them after an island located in the center of the Rance estuary, France.

References 

Rock formations of Adélie Land